The Departments of the Republic of the Congo are divided into 86 districts and 6 communes; which are further subdivided into urban communities (communautés urbaines) and rural communities (communautés rurales); which are further subdivided into quarters or neighborhoods (quartiers) and villages. Note the departments of Brazzaville and Pointe-Noire are made of 1 commune each, then divided in urban districts (arrondissements).

The districts are listed below, by department:

Current divisions

Northern Congo
 Cuvette

 Owando
 Makoua
 Boundji
 Mossaka
 Loukoléla
 Oyo
 Ngoko
 Ntokou
 Tchikapika

 Cuvette-Ouest

 Ewo
 Kellé
 Mbomo
 Okoyo
 Etoumbi
 Mbama

 Likouala

 Impfondo
 Epéna
 Dongou
 Bétou
 Bouanéla
 Enyellé
 Liranga

 Plateaux

 Djambala
 Lékana
 Gamboma
 Abala
 Allembé
 Makotimpoko
 Mbon
 Mpouya
 Ngo
 Ollombo
 Ongogni

 Sangha

 Mokéko
 Sembé
 Souanké
 Pikounda
 N'gbala

Southern Congo
 Bouenza

 Madingou
 Mouyondzi
 Boko–Songho
 Mfouati
 Loudima
 Kayes
 Kingoué
 Mabombo
 Tsiaki
 Yamba

 Kouilou

 Hinda
 Madingo–Kayes
 Mvouti
 Kakamoéka (Kakamoueka in; Kakamoeka in; Kakamoéka in )
 Nzambi
 Tchiamba-Nzassi (Tchiamba Nzassi in; Tchiamba-Nzassi in )

 Lékoumou

 Sibiti
 Komono
 Zanaga
 Bambama
 Mayéyé

 Niari

 Louvakou
 Kibangou
 Divénié
 Mayoko
 Kimongo
 Moutamba
 Banda
 Londéla–Kayes
 Makabana
 Mbinda
 Moungoundou-sud
 Nyanga
 Moungoundou-nord
 Yaya

 Pool

 Kinkala
 Boko
 Mindouli
 Kindamba
 Goma Tsé-Tsé
 Mayama
 Ngabé
 Mbanza–Ndounga
 Louingui
 Loumo
 Ignié
 Vindza
 Kimba

Historical divisions

Northern Congo

Cuvette Department

 Boundji District
 Loukela District
 Makoua District
 Mossaka District
 Okoyo District
 Owando District

Cuvette-Ouest Department

 Ewo District
 Kelle District
 Mbomo District

Likouala Department

 Dongou District
 Epena District
 Impfondo District

Plateaux Department

 Abala District
 Djambala District
 Gamboma District
 Lekana District

Sangha Department

 Ouésso District
 Sembé District
 Souanke District

Southern Congo

Bouenza Department

 Boko-Songho District
 Loudima District
 Madingou District
 Mfouati District
 Mouyondzi District
 Nkayi District

Kouilou Department

 Kakamoeka District
 Madingo-Kayes District
 Mvouti District
 Pointe-Noire District

Lékoumou Department

 Bambama District
 Komono District
 Sibiti District
 Zanaga District

Niari Department

 Divenie District
 Kibangou District
 Kimongo District
 Louvakou District
 Mayoko District
 Mossendjo District

Pool Department

 Boko District
 Kindamba District
 Kinkala District
 Mayama District
 Mindouli District
 Ngabe District

See also
Departments of the Republic of the Congo

External links
 Congo Districts at Statoids.com

References

 
Subdivisions of the Republic of the Congo
Congo, Republic of, Districts
Congo, Republic of 2
Districts, Congo, Republic of
Republic of the Congo geography-related lists